Vrohi Ton Asterion (Greek: Βροχή Των Αστεριών) is a studio album by Greek artist Glykeria. It was released on November, 2006 by Sony BMG Greece and also is her first studio album since the Gold 2004 release of Aniksi.

The album involves an array of lyricists and composers including fellow artists Mihalis Hatzigiannis and Haris Alexiou; also other well-known writers/composers Eleana Vrahali, Nikos Terzis, Nikos Moraitis and Glykeria's long-time collaborator Stefanos Fotiadis. The album also features Melina Aslanidou in the duet "I Zoi Odigi Taxi".

Track listing

2006 albums
Glykeria albums
Greek-language albums
Sony Music Greece albums